William Patrick Doolan (27 July 1895 – 20 November 1963) was an Australian rules footballer who played with Footscray in the Victorian Football League (VFL).

Notes

External links 

1895 births
1963 deaths
Australian rules footballers from Victoria (Australia)
Footscray Football Club (VFA) players
Western Bulldogs players